Ali El-Sayed Ali El-Moselhi is the Egyptian minister of Supply and Internal Trade in the cabinet of Moustafa Madbouly and a member of the Parliament, the People's Assembly, for the constituency Abu Kabeer, Ash Sharqiyah Governorate.

He was the directing manager of "Standardata" (a software company based in Roxy, Heliopolis, Cairo).

References

Members of the House of Representatives (Egypt)
Living people
Year of birth missing (living people)
Supply and internal trade ministers of Egypt
Social affairs ministers of Egypt